Ranua Airfield  is an airfield in Ranua, Finland, located  northwest of Ranua centre.

See also
List of airports in Finland

References

External links
 Lentopaikat.net – Ranua Airfield 

Airports in Finland
Airfield
Buildings and structures in Lapland (Finland)